The Bucktown Five was a jazz group active in the early 1920s in the Chicago area of the United States. The group played a New Orleans style of collective improvisational jazz and were forerunners of the Chicago style which developed in later years. About eighteen months after breaking up, many of the same players recorded in Chicago as the Stomp Six. The Bucktown Five also recorded with Bix Beiderbecke.

The band's name is linked with New Orleans, as Bucktown is a Chicago neighborhood, but also the name of the settlement that grew up on the shore of Lake Pontchartrain after the close of Storyville. It became a smaller version of that district.

Members
 Guy Carey - trombone
 Volly De Faut - clarinet, alto saxophone
 Marvin Saxbe - banjo, guitar, cymbal
 Bill Shelby - banjo
 Muggsy Spanier - cornet
 Mel Stitzel - piano

Discography
The group recorded on the Claxtonola and other labels. Recordings include:
The Bucktown Five - Chicago Blues, 1924	 
The Bucktown Five - Hot Mittens, 1924	 
The Bucktown Five - Mobile Blues, 1924	 
The Bucktown Five - Really A Pain, 1924	 
The Bucktown Five, Bix Beiderbecke - Buddy's Habits, 1924	 
The Bucktown Five, Bix Beiderbecke - Chicago Blues, 1924	 
The Bucktown Five, Bix Beiderbecke - Someday Sweetheart, 1924	 
The Bucktown Five, Bix Beiderbecke - Steady Roll Blues, 1924

References

External links
Bucktown Five - Steady Roll Blues (1924) from YouTube

American jazz ensembles from Illinois
Musical groups from Illinois
Gennett Records artists